Norman Roorda (July 23, 1928 – May 27, 2012) was an American politician who served in the Iowa House of Representatives from 1967 to 1975.

He died on May 27, 2012, in Madrid, Iowa at age 83.

References

1928 births
2012 deaths
Republican Party members of the Iowa House of Representatives